Adolphe Siret (July 15, 1818 – January 6, 1888) was a Belgian historian, biographer, essayist, poet, biographer, writer and man of letters.

Works

Bibliographies of painters
Adolphe Siret, Dictionnaire historique des peintres de toutes les écoles depuis les temps les plus reculés jusqu'à nos jours, Bruxelles, Librairie encyclopédique de Périchon, 1848
Adolphe Siret, Dictionnaire historique des peintres de toutes les écoles depuis l'origine de la peinture jusqu'à nos jours, Paris, A. Lacroix et Cie, 1874, 1155 p. 
Adolphe Siret, Dictionnaire historique et raisonné des peintres de toutes les écoles depuis l'origine de la peinture jusqu'à nos jours, vol. 1, Chez les Principaux Libraires, 1883, 568 p.
Adolphe Siret, Dictionnaire historique et raisonné des peintres de toutes les écoles depuis l'origine de la peinture jusqu'à nos jours, t. 1, Berlin, Joseph Altmann, 1924

Other
Adolphe Siret, Raphaël et Rubens et les peintres de leur école, Gand, De Busscher Frères, 1849
Adolphe Siret, Louise d'Orléans Première reine des Belges : poème couronné par l'Académie royale des sciences, des lettres et des beaux-arts de Belgique, dans la séance publique du 8 mai 1851, 1851, 16 p.
Adolphe Siret, La gravure en Belgique, Hebbelynck, 1852 
Adolphe Siret, Notes d'un amateur sur quelques tableaux du musée de peinture de Bruxelles, Hebbelynck, 1852
Adolphe Siret, Récits historiques belges, Bruxelles, H Tarlier, 1855, 402 p.
(nl) Adolphe Siret, Mijn oom de tooveraar : verhalen der provincie Luik, Rogghé, 1864, 12 p.
(nl) Adolphe Siret, De drie gildebroêrs, 1864, 12 p.
(nl) Adolphe Siret, Avondverhalen aan den haard: provincie Henegouwen, 1864, 111 p.
Adolphe Siret, Erin Corr, membre de la classe des beaux-arts de l'académie royale de belgique. Notice, Hayez, 1865, 12 p.
(nl) Adolphe Siret, De legendenverteller: verhalen der provincien Limburg en Luxemburg, Rogghé, 1868, 86 p. 
(nl) Adolphe Siret, Het land van Waas : tweede aflevering, Edom, 1868
(nl) Adolphe Siret, De historische twist: verhalen der provincie West-Vlaanderen, Rogghé, 1868, 95 p.
(nl) Adolphe Siret, De kunstgalerij: verhalen der provincie Antwerpen, Rogghé, 1868, 12 p.
(nl) Adolphe Siret, De negen provincien van België: historische verhalen, Rogghé, 1868, 443 p. 
(nl) Adolphe Siret, Het familiehandschrift: verhalen der provincie Braband, Rogghé, 1868, 95 p.
(nl) Adolphe Siret, De vakantien (brieven van een student): verhalen der provincie Namen, Rogghé, 1868, 12 p.
Adolphe Siret, Notice sur Joseph-Ernest Buschmann, correspondant de l'Académie, Hayez, 1870, 12 p.
(nl) Adolphe Siret, Frederic van de Kerkhove : landschapschilder, Drukkerij Popp, 1874
Adolphe Siret, L'Enfant de Bruges [Frédéric Van de Kerckhove], renseignements biographiques, documents, articles de journaux, lettres ..., A. Lévy, 1876, 418 p

References

1818 births
1888 deaths
19th-century Belgian historians
Belgian writers
Belgian poets
Belgian biographers